Jean-Paul Martin-du-Gard (3 May 1927 – 26 February 2017) was a French runner who competed in the 1952 Summer Olympics and in the 1956 Summer Olympics.

References

1927 births
2017 deaths
Athletes from Paris
Olympic athletes of France
Athletes (track and field) at the 1952 Summer Olympics
Athletes (track and field) at the 1956 Summer Olympics
French male sprinters
European Athletics Championships medalists
Athletes (track and field) at the 1951 Mediterranean Games
Athletes (track and field) at the 1955 Mediterranean Games
Mediterranean Games gold medalists for France
Mediterranean Games medalists in athletics
20th-century French people
21st-century French people